The Governor of Astrakhan Oblast is the head of government of Astrakhan Oblast, a federal subject of Russia.

The position was introduced in 1991 as Head of Administration of Astrakhan Oblast. The Governor is elected by direct popular vote for a term of five years.

List of officeholders

References 

Politics of Astrakhan Oblast
 
Astrakhan